West Suffolk may refer to the following places in Suffolk, England:

 West Suffolk (county), a county until 1974
 West Suffolk District, a local government district established in 2019
 West Suffolk (UK Parliament constituency), an electoral district created in 1997
 West Suffolk College, a college in Bury St Edmunds
 the western part of Suffolk

See also 
 Suffolk (disambiguation)